The meridian 28° west of Greenwich is a line of longitude that extends from the North Pole across the Arctic Ocean, Greenland, the Atlantic Ocean, the Azores, the Southern Ocean, and Antarctica to the South Pole.

The 28th meridian west forms a great circle with the 152nd meridian east.

From Pole to Pole
Starting at the North Pole and heading south to the South Pole, the 28th meridian west passes through:

{| class="wikitable plainrowheaders"
! scope="col" width="125" | Co-ordinates
! scope="col" | Country, territory or sea
! scope="col" | Notes
|-
| style="background:#b0e0e6;" | 
! scope="row" style="background:#b0e0e6;" | Arctic Ocean
| style="background:#b0e0e6;" |
|-
| 
! scope="row" | 
| Moore Glacier (Northern Peary Land)
|-
| style="background:#b0e0e6;" | 
! scope="row" style="background:#b0e0e6;" | Frederick E. Hyde Fjord
| style="background:#b0e0e6;" |
|-
| 
! scope="row" | 
| Melville Land (Southern Peary Land)
|-
| style="background:#b0e0e6;" | 
! scope="row" style="background:#b0e0e6;" | Independence Fjord
| style="background:#b0e0e6;" |
|-valign="top"
| 
! scope="row" | 
| Mainland, the island of Milne Land and the mainland again
|-
| style="background:#b0e0e6;" | 
! scope="row" style="background:#b0e0e6;" | Atlantic Ocean
| style="background:#b0e0e6;" |
|-
| 
! scope="row" | 
| Island of Graciosa, Azores
|-
| style="background:#b0e0e6;" | 
! scope="row" style="background:#b0e0e6;" | Atlantic Ocean
| style="background:#b0e0e6;" |
|-
| 
! scope="row" | 
| Island of São Jorge, Azores
|-valign="top"
| style="background:#b0e0e6;" | 
! scope="row" style="background:#b0e0e6;" | Atlantic Ocean
| style="background:#b0e0e6;" | Passing just east of Pico Island, Azores,  (at ) Passing just east of Leskov Island,  (at )
|-
| style="background:#b0e0e6;" | 
! scope="row" style="background:#b0e0e6;" | Southern Ocean
| style="background:#b0e0e6;" |
|-valign="top"
| 
! scope="row" | Antarctica
|-
|}

See also
27th meridian west
29th meridian west

w028 meridian west